John Miner is an American rock guitarist.

Biography 

Composer John Miner may be best known for his rock opera Heavens Cafe, which was staged at the Flamingo Theater in Las Vegas 1996, the Charleston Performing Arts Center in 1997, and later at Insurgo Theater  in Los Angeles in 2004.  Miner formed the progressive rock group Art Rock Circus to perform the music with a live band on stage alongside the singers and actors.  Investor Mike Lewis was instrumental in financing and staging Heavens Cafe. The Tributary Music Label released a live CD of Heavens Cafe to the progressive rock community in 2000.

Previously, Miner co-founded the California-based art rock band Mantra Sunrise in 1992 with singer-bassist Joel Bissing and drummer Wayne Garabedian.  The band produced the self-titled album "Mantra Sunrise"  in 1994.

In 2001  "A Passage to Clear" was released by Miner's Art Rock Circus, also
being conceptual in nature.  The album featured two female vocalists, Karyn Anderson, and Karen Marquart.  The album was not as well received as Heavens Cafe'.

Collaborating with drummer and composer Nolan Stolz, Miner rebuilt the Art Rock Circus from the ground up, and in 2005 released a double CD Tell a Vision.  The extensive keyboard palate in addition to Miner's eclectic guitar stylings found an accepting progressive rock audience.

In 2005, Miner wrote and constructed guitar parts for the K² (band) album Book of the Dead that would integrate around the lead parts of Allan Holdsworth.

Musically, Miner is known for his use of several alternate guitar tunings, and this is evident in nearly all his compositions.  The use of a double necked guitar has enabled the performer to switch from one tuning to another within the same song in a live situation.

His use of odd time signatures is apparent in the majority of his work as a composer, particularly in Heavens Cafe, in which the majority of the album features unorthodox metering. Other distinct characteristics of the composer include the absence of repeating choruses. Drum and bass parts are usually hinting toward melody, rather than standard rock fare. As a producer, Miner's analog recording techniques have been the discussion of much debate in the modern digital world.

Projects 

 Mantra Sunrise
 Heavens Cafe
 Art Rock Circus
 K² (band)

Discography  
From official website:

Albums 

 [2013] Variations on a Dream/ Art Rock Circus
 [2005] Tell A Vision/ Art Rock Circus
 [2005] Book of the Dead/ K2
 [2001] A Passage To Clear/ Art Rock Circus
 [1998] Heavens Cafe' Live/ Art Rock Circus
 [1996] Heavens Cafe'/ John Miner
 [1995] Lost My Way/ Mantra Sunset
 [1994] Mantra Sunrise/ Mantra Sunrise

References 
 Progressor- Russia: The merits of Heavens Cafe as a significant contribution to the historical genre of rock opera
 Russian Musicologist Vitaly Menshikov analysis of Tell a Vision
 Prognose- Art Rock Circus methodology/ pros and cons of analog recording
 Music Street Journal- Critical of Editing Tell a Vision/ Uniqueness
 Rock Reviews- Heavens Cafe Live shows in LA/  Sharing Guitar duties with Allan Holdsworth K2
 Hairless Heart Herald UK- Passage to Clear/ Complexity of arrangements
 Gibraltar Encyclopedia of Progressive Rock- Miner as Art Rock Circus Ringleader/ Odd meters/ Alternate tunings/ HC studio vs. HC Live
 Sea of Tranquility- Assessment of Miner's guitar playing on Heavens Cafe' Live/ critique of analog production values
 Expose Magazine-  assessment of the bands musicianship within the framework of Tell a Vision 
 Rock Progressivo Brazil- Reviews of three of Miner's works in Portuguese 
 Prognosis- Review of Tell a Vision
 Expose Magazine USA
 Prog Archives

 Progression Magazine Issue #46 2004
 Nucleus Magazine (Argentina) Interview with John Miner 12/ 7/ 2005
 American Theater Web Look at Heavens Cafe Live in Los Angeles
 American Freedom Interview with John Miner 7/ 13/ 2004

American male composers
21st-century American composers
American rock guitarists
American male guitarists
Guitarists from Nevada
Year of birth missing (living people)
Living people
Place of birth missing (living people)
21st-century American male musicians